Cheeseville is an unincorporated community in Siskiyou County, California, in the United States. Cheeseville has not been included in the past census counts, therefore does not have population information.

References

Unincorporated communities in Siskiyou County, California
Unincorporated communities in California